Deh Mian (also Romanized as Deh Mīān, Deh-e Mīān, Deh Mayān, Deh Meyān, and Deh Mīyan) is a village in Eshkanan Rural District, Eshkanan District, Lamerd County, Fars Province, Iran. At the 2006 census, its population was 25, in 5 families.

References 

Populated places in Lamerd County